Geandro Augusto de Paula (born November 26, 1987 in Jacareí), known as Geandro, is a Brazilian footballer who plays for São Bernardo as midfielder.

Career statistics

References

External links

1987 births
Living people
Brazilian footballers
Association football midfielders
Campeonato Brasileiro Série B players
Campeonato Brasileiro Série D players
Cianorte Futebol Clube players
Clube Atlético Bragantino players